Maxwell Jenkins (born May 3, 2005) is an American film and television actor, who is known for his roles in Lost in Space, A Family Man, and Sense8. In 2020, he played the role of Joseph Bell in the true story of Joe Bell, starring Mark Wahlberg and directed by Reinaldo Marcus Green. In 2021 he was cast as the young Jack Reacher in the Amazon Prime series.

Early life 
Jenkins is the son of Jeff Jenkins, a former Ringling clown, and Julie Greenberg, a film and theatre actress. They are the co-founders and directors of the Chicago-based Midnight Circus, whose proceeds help fund general improvements for the Chicago parks the circus is hosted in. Jenkins began performing with the circus at age three, and has performed acts including rola-bola, acrobatics, tightwire walking, juggling, and playing mandolin.

Career 
Jenkins started his acting career in ABC's Betrayal at age eight in 2013. He would then go on to have recurring roles in several series including Sense 8, directed by the Wachowski sisters, and Chicago Fire, where he portrayed the character of J.J. Holloway.  In 2016, Jenkins was cast as Will Robinson in Lost in Space, a Netflix remake of the iconic 1965 television series. His performance has been nominated for several Young Artist and Saturn Awards. In 2021, Jenkins was cast as a young Jack Reacher in the Amazon original show based on the popular book series.

Jenkins' work also includes several feature films. In 2016 he starred in A Family Man, which premiered at TIFF. In it he portrayed a young boy whose new illness forces his father, played by Gerard Butler, to reevaluate his priorities and search for a way to reconnect with his family. In 2020 he also starred alongside Mark Wahlberg, Connie Britton, and Reid Miller in the film Joe Bell. His role as Jadin Bell's younger brother was praised, with one critic noting his scenes to be among the film's most powerful.

Jenkins is also an avid musician, playing mandolin, guitar, bass guitar, violin, and drums. His band, Cowboy Jesus and the Sugar Bums, received a Chicago Music Award.

Personal life 
Alongside his professional successes, Jenkins has continued to perform in his family's non-profit circus show, Midnight Circus in the Parks.  Through this, performers have raised over $1m for Chicago park renovations, community projects, and overseas disaster relief.  Jenkins has also been a spokesman for the ASPCA, where he often advocates for better education, legislation, and protection for canine breeds. He has also helped raise awareness and funds for the conservation group Oceana.

In response to the NCAI efforts to remove Native American caricatures as sports mascots, Jenkins led a petition to change the stereotypical ‘Indian’ symbol used by his own high school. Speaking at his Local School Council, he argued that the symbol did not show respect to native peoples, and that there was a historical precedent for the school to change its policies to align with modern progress, just as it had when it changed its enrolment policy to accept female students. It was soon announced that the school would remove its Indian symbol as a mascot.

In 2020, Jenkins was honored for his various charity and community contributions when he was presented with a Community Leadership Award by the Young Artist Academy.

Filmography

Television

Film

Awards and nominations

References

External links
 

Living people
Place of birth missing (living people)
2005 births
American male film actors
American male stage actors
American male television actors
American male child actors
21st-century American male actors